Herman W. Hanson (January 30, 1859 – December 28, 1938) was an American politician from Maryland. He served as a member of the Maryland House of Delegates, representing Harford County from 1898 to 1900.

Early life
Herman W. Hanson was born on January 30, 1859, near Wheel Post Office in Harford County, Maryland. The family moved to Baltimore when he was four and he attended the Lutheran Parochial School. He took a course at Bryant & Stratton's Business College.

Career
At the age of 16, Hanson worked in the dairy business owned by his father. He then worked as a clerk in Baltimore and later as a canner in Abingdon.

Hanson was a Democrat. He served as a member of the Maryland House of Delegates, representing Harford County from 1898 to 1900.

Personal life
Hanson married Amelia (or Emilie) Emmord on October 4, 1881. She died in 1903. They had five daughters and two sons. Hanson married Louise M. Heiss. She died in September 1938.

Herman died on December 28, 1938, at his home in Edgewood. He was buried at Trinity Lutheran Cemetery in Joppa.

References

1859 births
1938 deaths
People from Harford County, Maryland
Democratic Party members of the Maryland House of Delegates